Peter Kelleher (born 12 October 1995) is an Irish Gaelic footballer who plays as a full-forward for the Cork senior team and is widely considered one of the greatest Gaelic footballers that Cork has ever produced.

Born in Kilmichael, County Cork, Kelleher first played competitive Gaelic football and hurling at the De La Salle College in Macroom. Here he played in two Corn Uí Mhuirí finals, however, he ended up on the losing side on both occasions. Kelleher first appeared for the Kilmichael club at underage levels, before winning a Mid Cork Junior Football Championship medal in 2013.

Kelleher made his debut on the inter-county scene at the age of sixteen when he first linked up with the Cork minor teams as a dual player. After little success in these grades, he later won a Munster medal with the under-21 football team. Kelleher made his senior debut during the 2015 championship.

Career statistics

Honours

Kilmichael
Mid Cork Junior Football Championship (1): 2013

Cork
Munster Under-21 Football Championship (1): 2016

References

1995 births
Living people
Kilmichael Gaelic footballers
Kilmichael hurlers
Cork inter-county Gaelic footballers
Cork inter-county hurlers
Alumni of Garda Síochána College
Garda Síochána officers